Symphlebia ignipicta is a moth in the subfamily Arctiinae. It was described by George Hampson in 1903. It is found in Brazil.

References

Moths described in 1903
ignipicta